Adentro Afuera is the second album by Peruvian alternative rock band Cecimonster Vs. Donka. One music video was released to promote the album: One Hundred Years.

Track listing

Personnel 
Band members

 Sergio Saba – vocals, guitar
 Sebastian Kouri –  guitar
 Alonso García – bass guitar
 Patrick Mitchell - drums

Additional personnel
 Aldo Rodriguez - Backing vocals on Family and Panamericana
 María Laura Bustamante - Backing vocals on Family
 Saito Chinén - Production, engineering, mastering

References 

2012 albums
Cecimonster Vs. Donka albums